The 1995 Arkansas State Indians football team represented Arkansas State University as a member of the Big West Conference during the 1995 NCAA Division I-A football season. Led by third-year head coach John Bobo, the Indians compiled an overall record of 6–5 with a mark of 3–3 in conference play, tying for fourth place in the Big West.

Schedule

References

Arkansas State
Arkansas State Red Wolves football seasons
Arkansas State Indians football